João da Cruz e Sousa (24 November 1861 – 19 March 1898), also referred to simply as Cruz e Sousa, was a Brazilian poet and journalist, famous for being one of the first Brazilian Symbolist poets. A descendant of African slaves, he has received the epithets of "Black Dante" and "Black Swan".

He is the patron of the 15th chair of the Academia Catarinense de Letras.

Biography
Cruz e Sousa was born João da Cruz on 24 November 1861, in the city of Florianópolis (at the time called Nossa Senhora do Desterro), in the province of Santa Catarina. His father was Guilherme da Cruz, a bricklayer, and his mother was Carolina Eva da Conceição – with both of them being freed Afro-Brazilian slaves. Sousa's former owner, the Marshal Guilherme Xavier de Sousa, treated him like a close relative, teaching him how to read, write and speak Greek, French and Latin. He also gave João da Cruz his surname Sousa. Cruz e Sousa also studied Mathematics and natural sciences under the guidance of famous German biologist Fritz Müller.

In 1881, Cruz e Sousa served as director of the newspaper Tribuna Popular, where he wrote abolitionist articles. In 1883, Sousa tried to become an attorney for the city of Laguna, but was not accepted for being black. In 1885 he published his first poetry book, Tropos e Fantasias, in partnership with Virgílio Várzea. In 1890 he moved to Rio de Janeiro, where he worked as an archivist at the Estrada de Ferro Central do Brasil. In 1893 he published his two famous books Missal and Broquéis, that introduced the Symbolist movement in Brazil. In November of the same year, he married Gavita Gonçalves, an educated black girl who worked as a seamstress, and had with her four children; however, all four would die prematurely due to tuberculosis, what made Gavita have a mental breakdown and go insane ever since.

Cruz e Sousa died in what is today the city of Antônio Carlos, in the Brazilian state of Minas Gerais, on March 19, 1898, due to tuberculosis.

Works
 Tropos e Fantasias (1885 — in partnership with Virgílio Várzea)
 Broquéis (1893)
 Missal (1893)
 Evocações (1898)
 Faróis (1900 — posthumous)
 Últimos Sonetos (1905 — posthumous)
 O Livro Derradeiro (1945, expanded 1961 — posthumous)
 Dispersos (1961 — posthumous)

Further reading
 COUTINHO, Afrânio; SOUSA, J. Galante de. Enciclopédia da Literatura Brasileira. São Paulo: Global
 LEMINSKI, Paulo. Cruz e Sousa. São Paulo: Brasiliense. Coleção Encanto Radical, n. 24, 79 p.

External links

Cruz e Sousa - Master of the Symbolism. Biography of Cruz e Sousa written by professor Evaldo Pauli.
Newspaper A Notícia: Cruz e Sousa
Encyclopædia Britannica
 

1861 births
1898 deaths
Brazilian male poets
Brazilian journalists
Brazilian abolitionists
19th-century deaths from tuberculosis
Tuberculosis deaths in Minas Gerais
People from Florianópolis
Symbolist poets
Sonneteers
19th-century journalists
Male journalists
19th-century Brazilian poets
19th-century Brazilian male writers
Afro-Brazilian people